The women's 4 × 100 metres relay event at the 1936 Olympic Games took place on August 8 and August 9. The American team won with a time of 46.9 s after the German team, which had been in the lead, dropped the baton on the final leg.

Results

Heats

Heat 1

Key: Q = Qualified

Heat 2

Key: Q = Qualified, WR = World record

Final

Key: DSQ = Disqualified

In the heats, the German team set a world record of 46.4 s. In the final, they built a commanding lead, but their fourth runner, Ilse Dörffeldt, dropped the baton. The American team won in 46.9 s.

References

Women's 4x100 metre relay
Relay foot races at the Olympics
4 × 100 metres relay
1936 in women's athletics
Women's events at the 1936 Summer Olympics